Otis Wonsley (born August 13, 1957) is a former American football running back who played for the Washington Redskins of the National Football League (NFL).  He played college football at Alcorn State University and was drafted in the ninth round of the 1980 NFL Draft.

Early life
Wonsley was born in Pascagoula, Mississippi, and played high school football at Moss Point High School in Moss Point, Mississippi.

College career
Wonsley attended and played college football at Alcorn State University in Lorman, Mississippi.  During his career at Alcorn State, he rushed for over 1,500 yards.

Professional career
Wonsley was drafted in the ninth round (229th overall) of the 1980 NFL Draft by the New York Giants, but was cut by the Giants after training camp.  He was then signed by the Washington Redskins in April 1981, where he spent his entire playing career and was used primarily as a backup to John Riggins.  He was also a member of The Fun Bunch, which was a group of Redskins players known for their choreographed group celebrations in the end zone (usually a group high-five) following a touchdown.  The Fun Bunch's actions eventually resulted in a league-wide ban of "excessive celebration" in 1984.

Wonsley was a member of the Redskins Super Bowl XVII-winning team and played a vital role in what would be the game-winning play.  With 10 minutes remaining, the Redskins faced fourth and inches. They decided to go for it calling, "70 chip," a run play designed for Riggins in short-yardage situations. Riggins took the handoff from Joe Theismann and followed Wonsley and tight end Clint Didier through the left side.  Riggins then broke an attempted tackle by Dolphin cornerback Don McNeal and ran for a 43-yard touchdown.  The Super Bowl win was the Redskins' first championship victory since 1942.  On December 6, 2007, Riggins' run was voted by fans as the Redskins' Greatest Moment.

Personal life
Wonsley has two brothers, Nathan and George Wonsley, who were also running backs in the NFL.  He is the stepfather of NBA player Roger Mason, Jr.

References

External links
 

1957 births
Living people
Alcorn State Braves football players
American football running backs
People from Pascagoula, Mississippi
Players of American football from Mississippi
Washington Redskins players